Pârâu Crucii may refer to several places in Romania:

Pârâu Crucii, a village in Pogăceaua Commune, Mureș County
Pârâu Crucii, a village in Râciu Commune, Mureș County
Pârâul Crucii, a tributary of the Braia in Hunedoara County